The Bellanca CH-300 Pacemaker was a six-seat utility aircraft, built primarily in the United States in the 1920s and 1930s. It was a development of the Bellanca CH-200, fitted with a more powerful engine and, like the CH-200, soon became renowned for its long-distance endurance.

Design and development
Bellanca further developed the earlier CH-200 to create the CH-300 Pacemaker. The CH-300 was a conventional, high-wing braced monoplane with fixed tailwheel undercarriage. Like other Bellanca aircraft of the period, it featured "flying struts". While the CH-200 was powered by 220 hp Wright J-5 engines, the CH-300 series Pacemakers were powered by 300 hp Wright J-6s. Late in the series, some -300s were fitted with 420 hp Pratt & Whitney Wasps, leading to the CH-400 Skyrocket series.

Operational history

Pacemakers were renowned for their long-distance capabilities as well as reliability and weight-lifting attributes, which contributed to their successful operation throughout the world. In 1929, George Haldeman completed the first nonstop flight from New York to Cuba in 12 hours, 56 minutes, flying an early CH-300 (c. 1,310 miles, 101.3 mph). In 1931, a Bellanca fitted with a Packard DR-980 diesel, piloted by Walter Lees and Frederick Brossy, set a record for staying aloft for 84 hours and 33 minutes without being refuelled. This record was not broken until 55 years later.

In Alaska and the Canadian bush, Bellancas were very popular. Canadian-operated Bellancas were initially imported from the United States, but later, six were built by Canadian Vickers in Montreal and delivered to the RCAF (added to the first order of 29 made in 1929), which used them mainly for aerial photography.

In May 1964, Capt. A.G.K.(Gath) Edward, a senior Air Canada pilot, and Ken Molson (the then curator of the Aviation Museum of Canada based at Rockcliffe) traveled to Juneau Alaska to ferry Bellanca Pacemaker NC3005 back to the museum which had obtained the aircraft. Edward had flown a similar model of the Pacemaker floatplane for General Airways starting in June 1935 during his bushflying days. He and Molson delivered it to its final resting place in the museum on May 30, 1964, after a trip taking five days and just over 30 hours of flight time. The aircraft was reregistered CF-ATN as the original registered a/c was destroyed in an accident in June 1938.

Record attempts

On June 3, 1932, Stanislaus F. Hausner, flying a Bellanca CH Pacemaker named Rose Marie, powered by a 300-hp Wright J-6, attempted a transatlantic flight from Floyd Bennett Field, New York, to Warsaw, Poland. The attempt failed when he made a forced landing at sea; he was rescued by a British tanker eight days later.

On July 15, 1933 6:24 AM two Lithuanian pilots Steponas Darius ir Stasys Girėnas flying a heavily modified CH-300 named Lituanica lifted off from Floyd Bennet Field to attempt a non stop transatlantic flight. They successfully crossed the Atlantic, however crashed in the forest near Pszczelnik, Poland. Flying replica of the plane is on display in Lithuanian museum of Aviation, the wreckage of the original is kept in Vytautas Magnus War museum, Kaunas, Lithuania.

Variants
CH-300W –  CH-300 converted to use a Pratt & Whitney R-985 engine (one converted)
300-W –  Built with a Pratt & Whitney R-985 engine (seven built)
PM-300 Pacemaker Freighter – Cargo version (two built)

Operators
 
Austin Airways
Canadian Airways
Royal Canadian Air Force (13)
Starratt Airways

TACA Airlines

Aeronaves de Mexico

Widerøes Flyveselskap

Civil Aeronautics Authority (5+)
Department Of Commerce
Inter-Island Airways (Hawaiian Airlines)
Star Air Service
Wien Air Alaska

Surviving aircraft
 /upd this is replica, made by pilot/ engineer Vladas Kensgaila. Base aircraft to create was used is Jakovlev YAK-18. The N688E was register number for highly modyfied Bellanca CH-300, used for non stop transatlantic flight (New York  - Kaunas, LT) by lithuanian pilots Steponas Darius and Stasys Girenas in 1933.

Canada
 133 – CH-300 airworthy with Wright Holdco in Norman Wells, Northwest Territories.

upd:
Sold to former president of Lithuania Rolandas Paksas. Made first flight in Lithuanian skies on 6th of April 2022. https://www.respublika.lt/lt/naujienos/lietuva/kitos_lietuvos_zinios/pasigrozekite-pirmasis-istorinio-lektuvo-bellanca-skrydis-lietuvoje/ (lit)

 181 – CH-300 on static display at the Canada Aviation and Space Museum in Ottawa, Ontario. It was formerly operated by Alaska Coastal Airlines.

United States
 150 – CH-300 airworthy with Frederick W. Patterson III in American Canyon, California.
 154 – CH-300 airworthy with Hawaiian Airlines in Honolulu, Hawaii. It was acquired new in 1929 by Inter-Island Airways (renamed Hawaiian Airlines in 1941) and used for sightseeing over Oahu for two years before being sold in 1933. Acquired from an aviation enthusiast in Oregon in early 2009, the aircraft was restored at the Port Townsend Aero Museum and was unveiled at Honolulu International Airport later that year.
 187 – CH-300 on static display at the Shannon Air Museum in Fredericksburg, Virginia. It was previously on display at the Virginia Aviation Museum and has been converted to represent the Bellanca WB-2 Columbia.

Specifications

See also

References

Notes

Citations

Bibliography

 Szurovy, Geza. Bushplanes. St. Paul, Minnesota: Zenith Press, 2004. .
 Taylor, Michael J.H. Jane's Encyclopedia of Aviation. London: Studio Editions, 1989, p. 149.

External links

 aerofiles.com
 Canada Aviation Museum website
 Virginia Aviation Museum website

1920s United States civil utility aircraft
CH-300
High-wing aircraft
Single-engined tractor aircraft
Aircraft first flown in 1929